Latisha Chan and Martina Hingis were the defending champions, but Hingis retired from professional tennis at the end of 2017. Chan played alongside Bethanie Mattek-Sands, but lost in the first round to Svetlana Kuznetsova and Karolína Plíšková.

Ashleigh Barty and Demi Schuurs won the title, defeating Andrea Sestini Hlaváčková and Barbora Strýcová in the final 6–3, 6–4.

Ekaterina Makarova and Elena Vesnina were in contention for the No. 1 ranking but withdrew before their opening match.

Seeds
The top four seeds received a bye into the second round.

Draw

Finals

Top half

Bottom half

References

External links
 Main Draw

Women's Doubles